Lushab is a village in Isfahan Province, Iran.

Lushab or Lush Ab may also refer to:
 Lushab-e Fariman, Razavi Khorasan Province
 Lush Ab-e Qalandarabad, Razavi Khorasan Province